The Los Angeles Tribune was a newspaper published by Edwin T. Earl (1858–1919) after he had made a fortune through his invention of the refrigerated boxcar used to ship oranges from Southern California to Eastern markets. Its first issue was on July 4, 1911, and its last was on July 5, 1918.

References 

Newspapers published in Greater Los Angeles
1911 establishments in California
1918 disestablishments in California
Newspapers established in 1911
Publications disestablished in 1918